Puramathra is a village in Kulukkallur panchayath in Palakkad district in the state of Kerala, India.

Transportation-- You may take the bus, taxi or drive through yourself to the village.(Around one to two hours)

Gallery

References 

Villages in Palakkad district